Jim Goddard (born circa 1930) is a former American college basketball coach in the western United States.
He was the head coach at Idaho for three seasons and previously at his alma mater Lewis & Clark College in Portland, Oregon.

From Salem, Oregon, Goddard had been on the basketball coaching staff at Lewis & Clark for the previous six seasons, the last four as head coach. In each of the last two years, the Pioneers won the season title in the Northwest Conference, then in NAIA; and both teams advanced to the 32-team national tournament in Kansas City, Missouri. Lewis & Clark won in the first round in 1962, and advanced to the quarterfinals in 1963; that team was inducted into the school's athletic hall 

After Idaho's successful 20–6 season in 1963 with Gus Johnson at center, head coach Joe Cipriano departed for Nebraska, and athletic director Skip Stahley hired Goddard  He led the Vandals for the first three seasons of the six-team Big Sky Conference, then unexpectedly resigned in August 1966 for an administrative position at the Oregon department of education  He was succeeded by alumnus Wayne Anderson, a longtime assistant and head baseball coach.

Head coaching record

References

External links
Sports-Reference.com - Jim Goddard
Gem of the Mountains: 1964 University of Idaho yearbook – 1963–64 basketball season

1930 births
Living people
American men's basketball coaches
American men's basketball players
Basketball coaches from Oregon
Basketball players from Oregon
College men's basketball head coaches in the United States
College men's basketball players in the United States
Idaho Vandals men's basketball coaches
Lewis & Clark College alumni
Lewis & Clark Pioneers men's basketball coaches
Sportspeople from Salem, Oregon
Guards (basketball)